Roland "Cuke" Barrows (October 20, 1883 – February 10, 1955) was a baseball outfielder who played for the Chicago White Sox of Major League Baseball from 1909 to 1912. Barrows played in 32 games and had a career batting average of .192.

References

External links

1883 births
1955 deaths
Major League Baseball outfielders
Baseball players from Maine
Chicago White Sox players
People from Gorham, Maine
Minor league baseball managers
Portland Blue Sox players
New Bedford Whalers (baseball) players
Lowell Tigers players
Jersey City Skeeters players
Rochester Hustlers players
Baltimore Orioles (IL) players
Lowell Grays players
People from Gray, Maine